The Ministry for Social Equality, until August 2015 called the Ministry for Senior Citizens (Misrad LeAzrahim Vatikim), is a government ministry in Israel. The ministerial post was created following the coalition agreement between Kadima and Gil (the Pensioners' Party) after the 2006 elections, although the ministry itself was not formed until a vote of approval by the Knesset on 25 July 2007.

List ministers

Deputy ministers

References

External links
Official website

Social Equality
Ministry of Social Equality
Social Equality